Federico de Vinciolo or Federico Vinciolo was a sixteenth-century lace-maker and pattern designer attached to the court of Henry II of France.  He was granted a monopoly on manufacturing lace ruffs in France.

His book of needlework patterns, Les Singuliers et Nouveaux Pourtaicts, was published in many editions between 1587 and 1623.

An unabridged reprint of a 1909 facsimile of this book was issued by Dover Books as Renaissance Patterns for Lace, Embroidery and Needlepoint in 1971.

References
Montupet, Janine, and Ghislaine Schoeller: Lace: The Elegant Web, .
Vinciolo, Federico: Renaissance Patterns for Lace, Embroidery and Needlepoint, Dover Books, 1971.

External links
Online facsimile of ''Les Singuliers'

Lace
16th-century French people
16th-century Italian businesspeople